Lesser Armenia (Pokr Hayk; , Greek: Mikre Armenia, Μικρή Αρμενία), also known as Armenia Minor and Armenia Inferior, comprised the Armenian–populated regions primarily to the west and northwest of the ancient Kingdom of Armenia (also known as Kingdom of Greater Armenia). The region was later reorganized into the Armeniac Theme under the Byzantine Empire.

Geography

Lesser Armenia (or Armenia Minor) was the portion of historic Armenia and the Armenian Highlands lying west and northwest of the river Euphrates. It received its name to distinguish it from the much larger eastern portion of historic Armenia—Greater Armenia (or Armenia Major).

Initial history

Early history
From the 6th century BC, the territory of Lesser Armenia was ruled by the Orontid Dynasty (Yervanduni), who were subjects of the Achaemenid Empire. The early Armenian kingdom was named the Satrapy of Armenia.

Some time after the death of Alexander the Great, Mithridates, a Persian nobleman from Asia Minor, declared himself king of the region that later became known as the Kingdom of Pontus. As the kingdom grew in strength, it included Lesser Armenia well.

Roman–Persian wars

Armenia was a disputed kingdom between Rome and Parthia during the Roman–Persian Wars from 66 BC to the 2nd century AD. Roman influence was first established with Pompey's campaign of 66/65 BC, and again in 59 AD in the Roman–Parthian War campaign of Gnaeus Domitius Corbulo; which resulted in the deposition of Tiridates I.

Roman and Byzantine Lesser Armenia

All of Armenia became a Roman province in AD 114 under Roman emperor Trajan, but Roman Armenia was soon after abandoned by the legions in 118 AD and became a vassal kingdom. Lesser Armenia, however, was generally incorporated by Trajan, together with Miletene and Cataonia, into the province of Cappadocia. Lesser Armenia consisted of five districts: Orbalisene in the North; below that Aetulane; Aeretice; then Orsene; and finally Orbesine, the most southern. The more southern districts appended to Lesser Armenia were Miletene, so called from its capital (the modern Malatya) and the following four small districts of ancient Cataonia, namely, Aravene; Lavinianesine or Lavianesine; Cataonia, in the more restricted sense, or the country close upon Cilicia surrounded by mountains; finally, Muriane or Murianune, between Cataonia and Melitene, called likewise Bagadoania.

Romans lost Armenia again to Vologases IV of Parthia in AD 161. In 163, a Roman counter-attack under Statius Priscus once again installed a favoured candidate on the throne of Armenia, and Roman influence in Armenia remained until the Roman temporary defeat at the Battle of Barbalissos in 253. But a few years later, at the end of the 3rd century, Rome was again in control of Armenia.

Lesser Armenia was reunited with the kingdom of Greater Armenia under the Arshakuni king Tiridates III in AD 287 until the temporary conquest of Shapur II in 337.

Then it was formed into a regular province under Diocletian, and in the 4th century, was divided in two provinces: First Armenia (Armenia Prima), which contained most of Lesser Armenia, and Second Armenia (Armenia Secunda) that comprised all the southern tracts which had been added to Lesser Armenia, with the exception of Cataonia, which was incorporated with Cappadocia Secunda.

Its population remained Armenian but was being gradually Romanized. Since the 3rd century many Armenian soldiers were in the Roman army: later–in the 4th century–they made up two Roman legions, the Legio I Armeniaca and the Legio II Armeniaca.

In 536, the emperor Justinian I reorganized the provincial administration, and First and Second Armenia were renamed Second and Third respectively, while some of their territory was split off to the other Armenian provinces.

The borders of the Byzantine part of Armenia were expanded in 591 into Persarmenia, but the region was the focus of decades of warfare between the Byzantines and the Persians (the Byzantine-Sassanid Wars) until the Arab conquest of Armenia in 639.

After this, the part of Lesser Armenia remaining under Byzantine control (in a lesser extent) became part of the theme of Armeniakon.

Mongol and Ottoman influence
After the downfall of Bagratid Armenia in 1045 and resulting subsequent losses of Byzantine Empire in the East in 1071 (after the Battle of Manzikert), Lesser Armenia fell to the Seljuks and then was part of the Mongol Empire for 92 years and of the Ottoman Empire from the late 15th century.

Between the 11th and 14th centuries the term Lesser Armenia (sometimes called "Little Armenia") was applied to the Armenian Kingdom of Cilicia, until the formation of Turkey in 1923.

Episcopal sees 
Ancient episcopal sees of the Roman province of Armenia Prima (I) listed in the Annuario Pontificio as titular sees:
{{columns-list|colwidth=30em|
 Berissa
 Colonia in Armenia (Köylühisar) (Armenian Catholic Church)
 Nicopolis in Armenia
 Pedachtoë (Bedochton, Pedachton)
 Satala in Armenia
 
 Sebastea (Sivas)
 Sebastopolis in Armenia (Sulusaray)
}}

Ancient episcopal sees of the Roman province of Armenia Secunda (II) listed in the Annuario Pontificio as titular sees:

For ancient episcopal sees of the Roman province of Armenia Tertia (III), see Roman Armenia#Episcopal sees.

Later history
Lesser Armenia is traditionally considered as part of Western Armenia, especially after the acquisition of Eastern Armenia by the Russian Empire in the aftermath of the Russo-Persian War of 1826-1828.

The Christian Armenian population of Lesser Armenia continued its existence in the area until the Armenian genocide of 1915–23. Some Armenians still live in the area, albeit converted to Islam under Ottoman influence, mainly in the 17th century.

See also
Hemshinli

Notes

 References 
 Bert Vaux, Hemshinli: The Forgotten Black Sea Armenians, Harvard University, 2001.
 Mack Chahin, The Kingdom of Armenia: A History, Routledge, London, 2001.
 Robert H. Hewsen, Armenia: A Historical Atlas'', University Of Chicago Press, 2000.

 
Former regions of Armenia
Late Roman provinces
Roman client kingdoms
States and territories established in the 110s